The Weißache is a river of Tyrol, Austria, a tributary of the Inn.

The Weißache flows in the Sölllandl, a valley between the Kaiser Mountains and the Hohe Salve.

The Ache flows through the following municipalities (in downstream order): Ellmau, Scheffau, Söll, Schwoich, Kufstein.

Before the road  branches off to Schwoich, the river is divided and a larger part is pumped under the hill t into a heat-only boiler station south of Kufsteins and acts as cooling water, before it flows back on a natural course into the Inn. This part discharges into the Inn around  after the boiler station.

In 2005 numerous measures were taken in Kufstein to reinforce the banks. The stream has cut ever deeper in the past years which could cause its banks to collapse.

References

Rivers of Tyrol (state)
Kufstein
Kaiser Mountains
Rivers of Austria